Events from the year 1586 in the Kingdom of Scotland.

Incumbents
Monarch – James VI

Events
March–July – Babington Plot, an attempt to assassinate Elizabeth I of England and replace her on the English throne by a rescued Mary, Queen of Scots, takes place. Anthony Babington and his co-conspirators are executed on 20 September.
 6 July – Treaty of Berwick signed, making peace between James VI and Elizabeth I of England.
Battle of Allt Camhna: the Clan Gunn and Clan Mackay defeat the Clan Sinclair.
Battle of Leckmelm: the Clan Sutherland, Mackays of Aberach and MacLeods of Assynt defeat the Clan Gunn.
Battle of the Western Isles on Jura: the Clan MacDonald of Sleat and Clan MacLean give battle.

Births
William Guild, minister (died 1657)
John Wemyss, 1st Earl of Wemyss, politician (died 1649)
Approximate date
Walter Balcanquhall, churchman (died 1645 in England)
Alexander Reid, royal physician (died 1643)

Deaths
 February – George Seton, 7th Lord Seton, Lord of the Parliament of Scotland (born 1531)
 1 August – Richard Maitland, lawyer and poet (born 1496)
Approximate date – Robert Crichton, Lord Advocate

See also
 Timeline of Scottish history

References